= Sex Crime: Sex Offending and Society =

Book by Terry Thomas

- Author: Terry Thomas
- Publisher: Willan
- Publication date: 232
- Pages: 232
- ISBN: 978-1843921059

Sex Crime: Sex Offending and Society is a book by criminal justice researcher Terry Thomas.
