= Terry Thomas (author) =

Criminal justice professor and writer

Terry Thomas is a criminal justice professor who taught at Leeds Beckett University. He is the author of Sex Crime: Sex Offending and Society, The Police and Social Workers, The Registration and Monitoring of Sex Offenders and co-author of The Resettlement of Sex Offenders After Custody.
